, also known as  was Japanese daimyo and the first head of the Later Hōjō clan, one of the major powers in Japan's Sengoku period. Although he only belonged to a side branch of the main, more prestigious Ise family, he fought his way up, gaining territory and changing his name in imitation of the illustrious Hōjō.

Biography
Traditionally Soun held a reputation of a rōnin who rose to power almost overnight in Kantō; however, he belonged to a prestigious family in the direct employment of the Ashikaga shogunate, and enjoyed important family connections. It has been said that Sōun was born at the Takakoshi castle in Okayama. His sister was married to Imagawa Yoshitada, a major daimyō from a prestigious cadet branch of the Ashikaga family. 

About 1475, under the cognomen of Ise Shinkuro, he worked for Imagawa, the constable of Suruga Province, and eventually became an "independent leader" with a number of warriors joining him.

Shinkuro became a retainer in the Imagawa clan, and when Yoshitada died in battle in 1476, Shinkurō mediated the succession dispute between supporters of Yoshitada's son Imagawa Ujichika and Yoshitada's cousin, Oshika Norimitsu. This proved a temporary peace. When Norimitsu again attempted to gain control of the Imagawa clan, Sōun came to Ujichika's defense, killing Norimitsu. Sōun was rewarded by Ujichika with Kōkokuji Castle. 

In 1491, he was able to take Horigoye after the death of Kantō kubō Ashikaga Masatomo, gaining control of Izu Province. He then adopted the surname of Hōjō and the given name of Sōun or Sozui.

He gained control of Izu Province in 1493, avenging a wrong committed by a member of the Ashikaga family which held the shogunate. With Sōun's successful invasion in Izu province, he is credited by most historians as being the first "Sengoku daimyō".

After building a stronghold at Nirayama, Hōjō Sōun secured Odawara Castle in 1494, the castle which would become the center of the Hōjō family's domains for nearly a century. In an act of treachery, he seized the castle after arranging for its lord to be murdered while out hunting.  

In 1516, he laid siege to the castle of Arai, and "was virtual master of all Sagami".

In 1519, Sōun died in Nirayama Castle and passed on the newly built Hōjō domains to his son Ujitsuna, who subsequently changed the clan name from the original Ise to Hōjō and posthumously renamed his father to Hōjō Sōun. In 1521, Ujitsuna built Sōun-ji temple dedicated to his father.

Family

 Father: Ise Morisada
 Mother: Daughter of Isa Sadanori
 Adoptive father: Ise Sadamichi
 Wife: Nan’yoin-dono
 Concubines:
 Katsurayama-dono
 Kennyoji-dono
 Children:
 Hōjō Ujitsuna by Nan’yoin-dono
 Hojo Ujitoki (d.1531) by Nan’yoin-dono
 Katsurayama Ujihiro (d.1538/1539) by Katsurayama-dono
 Chosoin-dono married Miura Ujiin by Kennyoji-dono
 Hōjō Genan (1493-1589) by Kennyoji-dono
 Seishoin-dono by Kennyoji-dono

References

Biography of Hojo Soun at Samurai-Archives.com

1432 births
1456 births
1519 deaths
Go-Hōjō clan
Daimyo